Harry Wright "Slinger" Esslinger (October 16, 1890 – November 28, 1970) was a college football player and high school football coach.

Auburn University
He was a prominent tackle for the Auburn Tigers football team of Auburn University.

1909
Esslinger was selected All-Southern in 1909.

Coaching career
He was a pioneer coach at Huntsville High School. He served in that capacity from 1920 to 1932.

References

1890 births
1970 deaths
Auburn Tigers football players
American football tackles
Sportspeople from Huntsville, Alabama
All-Southern college football players